Harpalus smyrnensis is a species of ground beetle in the subfamily Harpalinae. It was described by Heyden in 1888.

References

smyrnensis
Beetles described in 1888